Her Space Holiday is the recording moniker of indietronic and indie rock artist Marc Bianchi.

History
Marc Bianchi began as a musician in the California hardcore scene. He was a part of Indian Summer and Mohinder before assuming the moniker "Her Space Holiday" in 1996. Initially, Bianchi was not interested in releasing Her Space Holiday's first works, as he was focused on launching the bands associated with his new (now defunct) record label Audio Information Phenomena. However, after being approached by Chocolate River Industries to record a 12-inch EP, Her Space Holiday became Bianchi's full-time project.

Since the release of Her Space Holiday's first EP, the band has released six full-length albums, several singles and EPs, and a remix album. He has toured with Bright Eyes, The Faint, Pinback, Bob Mould, The American Analog Set, Lymbyc Systym and others. He has also remixed songs from REM, Duster, The Faint, The American Analog Set, Xiu Xiu, and others.

Released on October 7, 2008, in the United States, XOXO, Panda And The New Kid Revival is a departure from previous Her Space Holiday albums and with a new, less electronically oriented sound.  Bianchi brings a folk and jam feel and instrumentation to the material, with emphasis on songwriting. The live band for the Xoxo Panda material features Andrew Kenny of American Analog Set and Mike Bell & Jared Bell of Lymbyc Systym. This was followed with the release of a self-titled album on August 16, 2011, along with the announcement that this would be the last album from Her Space Holiday.

Sometime in 2017 it was announced through the official website that Her Space Holiday would be ending its six year hiatus and releasing an EP during Summer 2017. The EP, Gravity, was released in January 2018.

Discography

Studio 
 Audio Astronomy 12-inch (1997, Train Bridge)
 Re-release: Audio Astronomy 12-inch (2002, Tiger Style Records) – with additional tracks
 The Astronauts Are Sleeping, Volume 1 (1999, Skylab Operations)
 The Astronauts Are Sleeping, Volume 2 (1999, No Karma)
 Re-release: The Astronauts Are Sleeping 2.0 (2002, Neoplex Records) – Japanese release
 Home Is Where You Hang Yourself (2000, Tiger Style / Wichita Recordings)
 Re-release: Home Is Where You Hang Yourself 2.0 (2002, Tiger Style)
 Manic Expressive (2001, Tiger Style / Wichita)
 The Young Machines (2003, Mush Records / Wichita / & Records)
 The Past Presents the Future (2005, Wichita / V2 / & / Neoplex)
 The Telescope (2006, Youth Records / And) – Japanese release
 XOXO, Panda And The New Kid Revival (2008, Mush)
 Her Space Holiday (album) (2011, No More Good Ideas)

EPs 
 Something Blue CDEP (Bravenoiserecords)
 Silent Films CDEP (2000, Dogprint)
 Let's Get Quiet Vol. 1 CDEP / 12-inch (2005, Mush)
 Let's Get Quiet Vol. 2 CDEP / 12-inch (2007, Mush)
 Sleepy Tigers CDEP / 12-inch (2009, Mush)
 The Early Paws Collection (2009, No More Good Ideas)
 Gravity (2018)

Singles 
 Electronic Sunshine (Audio Information Phenomena)
 Split single with Flowchart, featuring the track "Silent Films"
 Wish List 7-inch (Motorway) – Japanese release
 "Slide Guitars and Moving Cars" 7-inch (Clover) – Japanese release
 "Bright Eyes vs Her Space Holiday" split 7-inch / CD - Wichita Recordings 2000
 "My Girlfriend's Boyfriend" CD single Wichita Recordings – European release 2004

Remix and compilation albums 
 Ambidextrous (2001, Wichita) – UK release
 The Young Machines Remixed (2004, Mush / Wichita / &)
 The Early Paws Collection (2009) - US tour release

A promotional MP3 of the song "Sleepy Tigers," from the album XOXO, Panda And The New Kid Revival, can be found here.

References

External links 
 Her Space Holiday
 Lazy-i Interview: September 2004

American indie rock musicians
Remixers
Musicians from the San Francisco Bay Area
Year of birth missing (living people)
Living people
Wichita Recordings artists
V2 Records artists